The 2007–08 Oral Roberts Golden Eagles men's basketball team represented Oral Roberts University during the 2007–08 NCAA Division I men's basketball season. The Golden Eagles, led by 9th year head coach Scott Sutton, played their home games at the Mabee Center and were members of The Summit League. They finished the season 24–9, 16–2 in Summit League play to be crowned regular season champions. They won the Summit League tournament to receive an automatic bid to the NCAA tournament as No. 13 seed in the South region. The Golden Eagles lost to No. 4 seed Pittsburgh in the opening round.

Roster

Schedule and results

|-
!colspan=9 style=| Exhibition

|-
!colspan=9 style=| Regular season

|-
!colspan=9 style=| Summit League tournament

|-
!colspan=9 style=| NCAA tournament

References

Oral Roberts Golden Eagles men's basketball seasons
Oral Roberts
Oral Roberts
2007 in sports in Oklahoma
2008 in sports in Oklahoma